The Athens Wireless Metropolitan Network (AWMN) is a grassroots wireless community network that was startedi in 2002 in Athens, Greece. It takes advantage of new wireless technologies to connect people and services. In August 2010 the network comprised 1,120 backbone nodes and more than 2,900 client computers were connected to it. There is also an association-club named awmn.

Cultural and geographical context 
Although the network began in Athens, the capital of Greece, its activities are no longer limited to the single city. It covers a geographical area (110 km from North to South and 85 km from West to East) with the most southern point being Palaia Epidavros (Epidaurus) and the most northern point being the town of Nea Artaki on the island of Euboea. The wide expansion of the network allows isolated areas with poor technological and broadband infrastructure to connect with the Athenian network. The islands of Aegina, Salamina and the regions surrounding Athens are also connected to the network.

Recently the island of Euboea connected with more links with AWMN for redundancy purposes and the next stage will be to join the wireless 'islets' located in Corinth, Lamia (city) and Volos. There are also plans to reach even more remote cities of Greece such as Patras.

This year AWMN connected most of the Greek communities and managed to cross the Greek borders. It has initiated a VPN connection with wlan slovenija network in Slovenia with the vision to connect all the wireless communities of Europe into one network.

Project history 
AWMN was formed as a community back in 2002. Due to tremendous problems with broadband services in Greece in 2002 the number of such services available to home users was extremely limited. It was mainly due to this problem that AWMN was founded as an alternative broadband network, which allowed its users to experience real broadband services.

However, after a short period from its birth AWMN started to change. An increasing number of people started to have an interest in the network, expressing their interest in joining this project. The number of network nodes started to grow exponentially, and the network's character changed from an alternative telecom network to a social network of people based on their interest in the IT/Telecom sector.

The network was always something alternative to just pure internet access medium. While now users and backbone nodes owners live in a much more mature broadband environment, they have not stopped being excited and active in the AWMN network. More services are emerging and more uses of high speed symmetrical broadband are being found, tested, developed and freely enjoyed by the users for the users.

The objectives of the project include the following: 
 Creating, developing and maintaining a Wireless Community Network which will provide broadband services to its members.
 Developing technologies based on wireless and digital telecommunications.
 Educate the public on the use of wireless and digital communications
 Promote and encourage volunteerism and active participation.

The association on August 2010 has around 67 members. Not all members of the backbone network are members of the association, and there are around 900 that do not want to participate to the association, claiming as a cause the extent of moderation and speech censorship that is practiced in the association's forum, wiki and assembly. Participation in the association has, throughout its history, always been on a voluntary basis. No one is obliged to sign a peering agreement as long as it's not needed and no one has to join the Association to participate to the network rendering the AWMN network as one of the most open networks in the world. However all 1080 backbone node owners are obliged to accept responsibility for the smooth running of their node, follow the basic rules of the community and follow basic network neutrality rules.

The community 
Users are categorised as backbone nodes and AP client nodes. The backbone nodes are nodes routing data that have no origin and destination themselves.

The network is a mosaic of people from varying ages and educational backgrounds including IT and telecommunications professionals, radio amateurs, IT students and technology enthusiasts. All are driven by a strong community spirit and contribute on a voluntary basis.

Technology 
AWMN makes extensive use of the IEEE 802.11 set of standards and operates on the 2.4 GHz (mainly for the Open APs) and 5.4 GHz (for the backbone links) license-free ISM frequency bands. Over the last few years, AWMN has tested (and later used in production environments) equipment from a huge variety of vendors.

The routing protocol used by the network is BGP. Efforts have been made to move towards new, more adaptive, experimental protocols such as OLSR and B.A.T.M.A.N. Some members of the AWMN community have contributed feedback and code to many Linux routing projects.

Homemade equipment is encouraged. Many workshops have been held so that members can become familiar with constructing their own aerials and cables. Additionally, the community regularly organizes seminars to educate aspiring network administrators on wireless technologies, protocols, routing and Linux, in the conditions of an operational large-scale network.

A wide variety of software is used in the network but AWMN services rely heavily on Open-source software, Linux (or other free Unix variants).

Solutions and services 
Nowadays the services provided by the network have evolved to a full-featured internal VoIP network, High Definition streaming services, game servers, file sharing services, hundreds of users/nodes webpages, network statistics services, routing, network monitoring, weather stations, VPN servers and just about anything and any service that someone would come across on the Internet.

A highlight to mention is the WiND project (WiND) project. As a large-scale network and community, AWMN has the need for a central management tool to display important node details. WiND is a Web Application targeted at Wireless Community Networks, such AWMN which has been created by members of AWMN. WiND provides a front-end interface to a database where information of the nodes can be stored, such as position details, DNS, IP addressing and a list of provided network services.

See also 
 List of wireless community networks

External links 
 The association site
 YouTube Video Presentation

References 

Wireless community networks
Organizations based in Attica
Athens society